USS LSM-333 was a  in the United States Navy during World War II. The ship was transferred to Thailand and renamed HTMS Kut (LSM-1).

Construction and career 
LSM-333 was laid down on 27 June 1944 at Pullman Co., Chicago, Illinois. Launched on 13 October 1944 and commissioned on 11 November 1944.

During World War II, LSM-333 was assigned to the Asiatic-Pacific theater. She took part in the Battle of Okinawa from 28 April to 18 May 1945.

LSM-333 was decommissioned on 28 July 1946 and later transferred to Thailand in October, later that year.

She was struck from the Navy Register in 1946.

The ship was commissioned into the Royal Thai Navy on 20 November 1947 and renamed HTMS Kut (LSM-1). She was later redesignated LSM-731 later in her career.

On 13 January 1989, the ship was decommissioned and stricken in 1990. She sits at Royal Thai Navy Dock Yard Phachunlachomklao until 17 September 2006, in which she was towed out to Pattaya Bay, to be sunk as the second artificial reef in the area.

Awards 
LST-333 have earned the following awards:

American Campaign Medal
Navy Occupation Service Medal (with Asia clasp)
World War II Victory Medal
Asiatic-Pacific Campaign Medal (1 battle star)

Citations

Sources 
 
 
 
 

World War II amphibious warfare vessels of the United States
Ships built in Chicago
1944 ships
LSM-1-class landing ships medium
Ships transferred from the United States Navy to the Royal Thai Navy